The Philippines Fed Cup team is a tennis team that represents the Philippines in Fed Cup competition. They are governed by the Philippine Tennis Association.

History
The Philippines competed in its first Fed Cup in 1974.  Their best result was reaching the 16th round in 1982. The team was set to participate at the 1979 Fed Cup, with their first game against the United States at the first round but withdrew from the tournament due to "administrative reasons". The Philippines competed in Asia/Oceania Zone Group II in the 2011 Fed Cup.

Current team (2017)
 Katharina Lehnert
 Anna Clarice Patrimonio
 Khim Iglupas
 Czarina Arevalo

See also
Fed Cup
Philippines Davis Cup team

References

External links

Billie Jean King Cup teams
Fed Cup
Tennis Fed Cup